EasyGroup Ltd (styled as easyGroup) is a British multinational venture capital conglomerate founded in 1998 and privately owned by Sir Stelios Haji-Ioannou. It is headquartered in London, UK.

Overview
The group is registered in the Cayman Islands, but operates from its office in Kensington, London. The company was established to expand the "easy" brand following the successful launch of EasyJet in 1995. The first use of "easy" after EasyJet was the EasyInternetcafé established in June 1999. This was followed in 2000 with the establishment of EasyRentacar, later renamed EasyCar.

easyGroup is the holding company controlling the "easy" family of brands. Through its wholly owned subsidiary EasyGroup IP Licensing Ltd, the company licences the Easy brand to other businesses. From 2012 to 2017, easyGroup also licensed the Fastjet brand to the low-cost African airline. The easyGroup of companies have a complex structure that contains elements of a generic conglomerate and a keiretsu, and sometimes it simply licences its brand. easyGroup publishes brand guidelines for all Easy companies to follow, together with the company's brand values:

The easyGroup logo is known for its distinctive orange colour, Pantone 021. The logo adopts the Cooper Black font, with lower case used for the "easy" part of the business name.

Subsidiaries and investments

The easyGroup contains several dozen easy branded business ventures in a wide range of sectors, some of which are listed below.

Formerly owned companies

Defunct ventures

Legal action
In the past easyGroup has threatened legal action against several businesses using "easy" as part of their name. This is because the "easy" prefix was for some time considered to be trademarked across a very wide range of services by easyGroup, but this has deemed to not necessarily be the case.

Easyart.com
In 2002, Easyart.com (now King and McGaw) faced legal allegations from easyGroup over its use of the easy name, accusing Easyart of "passing off" on easyGroup's good name. Easyart.com, which launched in September 1999, strenuously denied the charge and vowed to challenge Mr Haji-Ioannou in the high court. Easyart.com won the court battle when EasyGroup discontinued its legal action, saying it had "bigger targets to go after". Simon Matthews, the chief executive of Easyart.com, said in a statement "Stelios has surrendered and we have won. The law states a claimant who discontinues his claim is conceding he has lost or cannot win the case."

Before commencing legal action easyGroup's lawyers bombarded Easyart.com with threatening letters, despite having accepted £2,000 worth of advertising from the art company in its EasyInternet cafes not long after it launched. "This was a David and Goliath fight. It is a good day for smaller companies who stand up to bullying tactics from large corporations. We hope this gives hope to many other companies out there who are trading legitimately under the 'Easy' name and who have been threatened by this man", said Mr Matthews.

EasyMobile
In 2005, easyGroup threatened legal action against a Welsh company which had been trading as EasyMobile since 2003, two years before the launch of easyGroup's easyMobile business which is not currently running.

EasyPizza
In 2006, easyGroup dropped action against London businessman Karl Kahn after it emerged that his EasyPizza business predated easyGroup's business of the same name by several years.

easyCurry
In 2008, a restaurant in Northampton agreed to stop calling itself "easyCurry" after threats of legal action from easyGroup.

EasyJet
In July 2010, Sir Stelios criticised the previous chief executive of EasyJet's (Andy Harrison) handling of airline punctuality. In a statement he said: "I have been receiving many unsolicited complaints from members of the public and even easyJet pilots about the degree that the airline is short of crew to operate the flights it sold to its customers. Unless Mike Rake [the chairman] and Carolyn McCall [the new chief executive] do something to improve the situation for the sake of the travelling public, I am left with no option but to terminate the brand licence."

Other differences have emerged concerning travel-associated "extras" such as hotel bookings under the "easyJethotels" brand, and car hire under "easyJetcarhire". EasyGroup contended that it licensed the "easyJet" brand primarily for airline use, and that using the brand for hotel and car hire interfered with other EasyGroup businesses.

Eezy Drive
In 2011, the Edmonton-based company Eezy Drive received a letter from easyGroup's lawyer Clarke Willmott, asking the owner Zeeshan Haniffa to stop using the name of his driving school, Ezee Drive Driving School, accusing him of "intellectual property infringement" and giving him seven days to destroy £1,000-worth of signs, leaflets and posters using the name, and hand over website domain names within two weeks. Zeeshan Haniffa said in a statement: "When I received this letter, it seemed more like a threat to scare me off. They are accusing me of passing off on their name and misleading the marketplace. But there is no confusion, no misleading and no passing off. I think they are trying to bully me into doing what they want".

easyGroup said it is "unfair" to brand its actions as bullying, adding: "We expressly encourage the recipient to seek legal advice". It added in a statement: "We protect the 'easy' brand in order to protect consumers. In this way, we ensure that they are not misled into thinking they are dealing with an easyGroup company – on coming across a brand, the logo is not always visible, as is the case with radio advertising or Google ads which contain no specific font".

Easy Exercise
In 2012, a Northwich-based gym called Easy Exercise was challenged that it could not use the Easy name, with easyGroup citing "The easy name is synonymous with quality, value for money services and we have a duty to protect the public from its unauthorised use."

Pete Landon, managing director of Easy Exercise, which helps older women keep their mobility, said he was given an 80 per cent chance of success by his lawyers when threatened with the High Court action but the potential costs of losing, followed by a £100,000 bill in costs, would have been too much to handle: "It is a risk we would like to take but one we simply cannot afford. We have spent thousands on arguing our case and cannot accept the easyGroup proposition that the public actually believe that any goods or services marketed under the word 'easy' are done so with Stelios' consent. The easyGroup makes millions of profit and yet still threatens small businesses like our own in this way and while we would really like to fight on, we know that should we lose, we would not only pick up our own legal bill but also that of the easyGroup. We already face thousands in legal costs, the loss of our domain name and £50,000 for rebranding as Friendly Gym. We are not the first small company to become a casualty of easyGroup and I am sure we will not be the last. The Intellectual Property Office should never have granted the exclusive use of 'easy' to Stelios who now has the monopoly on a word in daily use."

Easy TV series
In September 2018, easyGroup was taking legal action against Netflix over its comedy series Easy, claiming its use of the name breaches its European trademarks. Netflix said in a statement that "viewers can tell the difference between a show they watch and a plane they fly in".

Easylife
In an important ruling in 2021, EasyGroup Ltd v Easylife Ltd (formerly Easylife Group Ltd), and another [2021] EWHC 2150, Dr Jonathan Cornthwaite of the long-established legal firm Wedlake Bell said "This case was brought in attempt to prevent a retailing business called Easylife Ltd and its director from (among other things) using various brands incorporating the word 'easy'. However, the claimant not only lost its cases for trade mark infringement and passing off, but also suffered the revocation of various of its UK trade marks on the grounds of non-use, and even the registration for easyJet itself took some punishment."

easyfundraising
In February 2022, easyGroup filed a lawsuit against the charity shopping website easyfundraising for "brand theft". It brought legal proceedings against its founder, Ian Woodroffe, and against one of its shareholders, Palatine Private Equity. "Brand thieves profit by creating major confusion in the minds of their customers, many of whom will think they are dealing with a member of the easy family of brands", an easyGroup spokesman said.

EASYOFFICE
In April 2022, Sir Stelios was described as a "deeply unimpressive witness" who gave answers "that were defensive to the point of implausibility" by a High Court judge who oversaw a trademark disagreement involving EASYOFFICE, owned by a company called Nuclei. The judge, Mrs Justice Bacon, found in favour of Nuclei and said four easyGroup trademarks should be revoked on the "grounds of lack of genuine use".

References

External links

 

EasyGroup
British companies established in 1998
Holding companies established in 1998
Holding companies of the United Kingdom
Conglomerate companies of the United Kingdom
Companies based in London